Amanita molliuscula is a mushroom of the large genus Amanita, which occurs under beech in Shaanxi Province in China. It is closely related to A. griseorosea.

See also

List of Amanita species
List of deadly fungi

References

molliuscula
Poisonous fungi
Deadly fungi
Fungi of Asia
Fungi of China
Fungi described in 2016